Starobayramgulovo (İśke Bayramğol) is a rural locality (a village) in Tungatarovsky Selsoviet, Uchalinsky District, Bashkortostan, Russia. The population was 281 as of 2010. There are 7 streets.

Geography 
Starobayramgulovo is located 60 km northeast of Uchaly (the district's administrative centre) by road. Orlovka is the nearest rural locality.

References 

Rural localities in Uchalinsky District